NWFP may refer to:

North-West Frontier Province, a province of British India, and later, Pakistan
Khyber Pakhtunkhwa, the modern province in Pakistan after its renaming in 2010